In geometry, the metabiaugmented truncated dodecahedron is one of the Johnson solids. As its name suggests, it is created by attaching two pentagonal cupolas onto two nonadjacent, nonparallel decagonal faces of a truncated dodecahedron.

External links
 

Johnson solids